Ecube Labs Co., Ltd. is a manufacturer of smart and connected waste bins and solar-powered portable waste compactors, reflecting the broader, global trend of Internet of Things.  Ecube Lab's garbage containers are equipped with sensors capable of monitoring their fill-level and bin status.  This allows waste collectors to reduce operating costs by up to 80% through lowering collection frequency.

Ecube Labs was established in 2011 and is headquartered in Seoul, South Korea at Guro Digital Industrial Complex, an industrial complex that has become a hub for high-tech companies and start-ups.

The company's smart waste management solution is currently being used in over 100 cities worldwide. Some of the largest product installations are located in Seoul, Melbourne, Baltimore, Dublin, Ibague and Ghent.

Products 
 CleanCUBE: A smart solar-powered waste compacting bin. Embedded sensors measure the bin fill-level in real-time and trigger automated compaction of waste, effectively increasing the bin capacity by 500% - 700%. Using either 2G or 3G wireless telecommunication technology, real-time data from CleanCUBEs is sent to Ecube Labs' online platform (CleanCityNetworks), allowing remote monitoring of bin status and fill-levels. The CleanCUBE boasts optional features such as Wi-Fi hotspot capability, LED back-lit advertisement panels, LCD screens, and motion-activated sound players.
 CleanFLEX: A wireless sensor that measures a container's fill-level in real time. The device is battery powered and can be attached to any type of container to monitor any type of waste. Using either 2G or 3G wireless telecommunication technology, CleanFLEX sends real-time data to CleanCityNetworks platform.
 CleanCityNetworks (CCN): An integrated waste management platform designed to optimize the efficiency of waste collection. CCN provides a comprehensive collection of historical data and analytics reports. It also allows users to monitor CleanCUBEs and CleanFLEX-equipped containers in real-time. In addition to CCN notifying users when and where collection is required in real-time, its predictive algorithms generate schedules for future collections. CCN also helps drivers by optimizing routes for each collection.
 CCNx: An FM solution which leverages the data of client's waste management operations and turns manually scheduled routes into fully optimized routes using machine learning algorithms.

Haulla Service 
 History
Haulla’s Service started in 2017, Haulla offers recurring collection, junk removal, and dumpster rental services. It started off as a front load hauling business in Los Angeles, California and has since expanded its service areas to Baltimore, Dallas, Houston, Austin, San Antonio and Corpus Christi. Dedicated to help businesses save at least 15% of what they are currently paying for their waste collection service, Haulla helps customers break their previous contract, provides a new dumpster, and deals with any issues that may arise throughout the waste collection process.

Haulla’s customer base falls within the commercial sector and includes but is not limited to retail, auto shops, restaurants/bars/good and beverage, faith based institutions, convenience stores, grocery stores, liquor stores, gas stations, commercial buildings, plazas, schools, and industrial plants.

 Operations
Haulla’s primary business is to provide waste collection and disposal services to business owners. Its goal is to lower the price of waste collection by connecting local business owners with local haulers with competitive pricing.
In the future, Haulla is planning to launch an automated waste collection service where an installed fill-level sensor will periodically take measurements of the accumulated waste volume and automatically dispatch a collection request to the waste hauler when a dumpster is full. There are plans for a matching system where waste haulers will be matched with dumpsters that need to be picked up based on the scope of their service and their current collection route to ensure efficiency.

References

External links
 Ecube Labs
 SKorea fosters startups as it seeks economic shift Information on the company's beginnings and working culture
 World's First "Bin-attachable Solar-powered Rubbish Fill Level Monitoring Solution"
 Ideas Print Money, Idea Builds Market
 Cases of Creative Economy

Solar-powered devices
Internet of things companies
Waste collection